The 2019–20 Liga Premier de México season is divided into two divisions named Serie A and Serie B. Liga Premier is the third-tier and fourth-tier football league of Mexico. The tournament began on 16 August 2019. On 15 April 2020 the regular season was suspended due to COVID-19 pandemic. On 22 May 2020, the 2019–20 season was officially cancelled.

Serie A

Changes from the previous season
Toluca, América, Necaxa, Monarcas Morelia and Guadalajara Premier were discontinued due to possible creation of Liga MX U23 league.
 Marina was promoted to Serie A as 2018-19 Serie B winner.
Atlético Saltillo Soccer, CAFESSA and Mineros de Fresnillo were promoted from Serie B as expansion teams.
Loros UdeC was promoted to Ascenso MX.
Atlético San Luis Premier joined the league.
 Deportivo Tepic J.A.P. franchise returned to the division as Atlético Bahía.
 Due to ground problems Real Zamora was put on hiatus in the 2019–20 season.
 Tuxtla F.C. ceased operation.
 Ocelotes UNACH reached an agreement with Cafetaleros de Chiapas, the team was promoted to Serie A, but moved to Tapachula and was renamed as Cafetaleros de Chiapas Premier.
 Cocodrilos de Tabasco were relocated in Liga TDP by their board and renamed to Pejelagartos de Tabasco.
 Héroes de Zaci, 2018–19 Liga TDP champions, remained in the same league due to problems with the ground.
 Pacific F.C. was on hiatus this season. The team will seek to obtain a place in the Ascenso MX through negotiations with another franchise for the 2020–21 season.
 Atlético Saltillo Soccer was renamed Saltillo F.C. but officially kept the original name.

Mid-Season Changes
 On December 18, 2019, as part of the disaffiliation of Club Veracruz two week earlier, Albinegros de Orizaba has also been disaffiliated from Serie A and will not participate in Second Half of Season.

Group 1

Teams information

Standings

Positions by Round

Results 
Each team plays once all other teams in 30 rounds regardless of it being a home or away match. In this group each team rests on two rounds of the season.

Group 2

Teams information

{{Location map+ |Mexico |width=650|float=right |caption=Location of teams in the 2019–20 Serie A Group 2 |places=

 Notes

Standings

Positions by Round

Results 
Each team plays once all other teams in 26 rounds regardless of it being a home or away match.

 Notes

Regular Season statistics

Top goalscorers 
Players sorted first by goals scored, then by last name.

Source: Liga Premier FMF

Hat-tricks 

(H) – Home ; (A) – Away

Attendance

Per team

 Notes

Highest and lowest

Source: Liga Premier FMF

 Notes

Coefficients table 
To determine the sowing of the teams classified to the playoff phase, a table of coefficients is used, in which the points obtained are divided between the matches played. Generally, this same table is used to determine the team relegated to Serie B, however, in the 2019–2020 season the category relegation was suspended.

Last updated: March 15, 2020 Source: Liga Premier FMFP = Position; G = Games played; Pts = Points; Pts/G = Ratio of points to games played; GD = Goal difference

Serie B

Changes from the previous season
Below are listed the member clubs of the Serie B for the 2019–20 season.

Gladiadores dissolved and renamed to Deportivo Dongu F.C.
La Paz will participate in the Serie B as an expansion team.
 Zitácuaro and Chapulineros de Oaxaca will rejoin the league after one year on hiatus.
Sporting Canamy reactivated its on hiatus franchise and created Real Canamy Tlayacapan, a reserve team.
 Atlético San Francisco and Aguacateros CDU were promoted from Liga TDP.
 Marina was promoted to Serie A as 2018-19 Serie B winner.
 Atlético Saltillo Soccer, CAFESSA and Mineros de Fresnillo were accepted as new teams in Serie A.
 Celaya Premier and Constructores de Gómez Palacio dissolved.
 Sahuayo were relocated in Liga TDP by their board.
 Ocelotes UNACH reached an agreement with Cafetaleros de Chiapas, the team was promoted to Serie A, but moved to Tapachula and was renamed as Cafetaleros de Chiapas Premier.
 FC Potosino will not play this season. Originally, this team had signed an agreement to move to Salamanca, Guanajuato and be renamed to Salamanca F.C., however, the Mexican Football Federation did not give its authorization for this change because the new field did not comply with the guidelines for participation in the league.

Teams information

{{Location map+ |Mexico |width=650|float=right |caption=Location of teams in the 2019–20 Serie B |places=

Season development

Standings

Positions by Round

Results 
Each team plays once all other teams in 26 rounds regardless of it being a home or away match.

Regular Season statistics

Top goalscorers 
Players sorted first by goals scored, then by last name.

Source:Liga Premier – Serie B

Hat-tricks 

(H) – Home ; (A) – Away

Attendance

Per team

Highest and lowest

Source: Liga Premier FMF

 Notes

References

External links
 Official website of Liga Premier de México
 Official magazine of Liga Premier de México

1